Buried in the Front Yard is the debut full-length studio album by thrash metal band Rumpelstiltskin Grinder.

Track listing
All songs written by Rumpelstiltskin Grinder, except where noted.
"Stealing E.T." – 4:11
"Orange & Black Attack" - 5:01
"Grab a Shovel (We've Got Bodies to Bury)" – 4:50 
"The Day Merman Met Todd "The Harpoon" Wilson" – 4:26 (Lyrics: Jason Sidote; music: R.G.)
"Unleash the Troll" – 3:46 
"Grinder" – 4:17 (Lyrics: Sidote; music: R.G.)
"Let the Fools Cheer" - 3:41
"Ode to Tanks" - 4:10 (Lyrics: Sidote; music: R.G.)

Personnel
Eli Shaika - Vocals
Melissa Moore - Guitars
Ryan Moll - Guitars
Shawn Riley - Bass
Patrick Battaglia - Drums

References

2005 debut albums
Rumpelstiltskin Grinder albums
Relapse Records albums